Dina Deborah Pomeranz (born 21 February 1977) is a Swiss economist and assistant professor of applied economics at University of Zurich. Pomeranz is considered to be one of the most influential Swiss economists.

Education 
Pomeranz grew up in Zürich, where she graduated from high school. She studied international relations at the University of Geneva and obtained her master's degree from the Graduate Institute of International and Development Studies in Geneva in 2004. In 2010 she received her PhD in economics from Harvard University with the dissertation Essays on Tax Evasion and Savings: Evidence from Three Randomized Experiments in Chile.

Research and career 
Pomeranz was an assistant professor at Harvard Business School before she joined the University of Zurich as an Assistant Professor of Applied Economics. At the University of Zurich, her research interests include development economics, public finance, and impact evaluations. Her research focuses on public policy in developing countries, particularly with regards to taxation and public procurement. She is a post-doctoral fellow at the MIT's Poverty Action Lab (J-PAL).

Pomeranz is an affiliate professor at the Bureau for Research and Economic Analysis of Development (BREAD) and the Center for Economic Policy Research (CEPR). She is a non-resident fellow at the Center for Global Development (CGD) and a member of the International Growth Centre (IGC). She is also a faculty research fellow at the National Bureau of Economic Research (NBER). She was elected to the Council of the European Economic Association for a 5-year term beginning in 2018. Pomeranz serves on the boards or advisory boards of Helvetas, Evidence Action, Policy Analytics, TamTam-Together Against Malaria and IDinsight.

Recognition 
Pomeranz's work has been published in The American Economic Review, the American Economic Journal: Applied Economics, and the Journal of Economic Development. In 2017, the European Research Council awarded her a Starting Grant for research on tax evasion and firm networks. In 2018, she was rewarded the Excellence Prize in Applied Development Research by Verein für Socialpolitik. She was ranked as one of the top ten most influential economists in Switzerland by Zurich-based newspaper Tages-Anzeiger.

Frankfurter Allgemeine Zeitung ranked Pomeranz the highest in social media influence in its 2019 ranking of economists, with data supported by the economics magazine Makronom. As of August 2020, Pomeranz was ranked 50th on RePEc's list of Top Young Economists.

Selected publications 
 with Sebastián Bustos, José Vila-Belda, Gabriel Zucman: "Challenges of Monitoring Tax Compliance by Multinational Firms: Evidence from Chile". AEA Papers and Proceedings, Volume 109, May 2019, S. 500–505, doi:10.1257/pandp.20191045.
 with José Vila-Belda: "Taking State-Capacity Research to The Field: Insights from Collaborations with Tax Authorities". Annual Review of Economics, Volume 11, August 2019, S. 755–781, doi:10.1146/annurev-economics-080218-030312.
 with Felipe Kast, Stephan Meier: "Saving More in Groups: Field Experimental Evidence from Chile". Journal of Development Economics, Volume 133, July 2018, S. 275–294, doi:10.1016/j.jdeveco.2018.01.006.
 with Paul Carrillo, Monica Singhal: "Dodging the Taxman: Firm Misreporting and Limits to Tax Enforcement". American Economic Journal: Applied Economics, Volume 9, No. 2, April 2017, doi:10.1257/app.20140495.
 "No Taxation Without Information: Deterrence and Self-Enforcement in the Value Added Tax". The American Economic Review, Volume 105, No. 8, August 2015, S. 2539–2569, doi:10.1257/aer.20130393.
 "Impact Evaluation Methods in Public Economics: A Brief Introduction to Randomized Evaluations and Comparison with Other Methods". Public Finance Review, Volume 45, No. 1, January 2017, S. 10–43, doi:10.1177/1091142115614392.
 with Cristobal Marshall, Pamela Castellon: "Randomized Tax Enforcement Messages: A Policy Tool for Improving Audit Strategies". Tax Administration Review, No. 36, January 2014, S. 1–21 (ciat.org).

References 

1977 births
Living people
Swiss women economists
People from Zürich
University of Geneva alumni
Graduate Institute of International and Development Studies alumni
Harvard University alumni
Development economists
21st-century  Swiss economists